João Pires may refer to:

 João Pires (athlete) (born 1979), Portuguese middle-distance runner
 João Pires (footballer) (born 1970), Portuguese footballer
 João Pires (bobsleigh) (born 1969), Portuguese bobsledder